The Slackers was a cassette-only 1993 album by The Slackers. Although self-released, Moon Records assisted in distribution of the release.

Track listing
 "Ray Gun Sally"
 "Rude Boy"
 "Sister Sister"
 "Red Onions"
 "Tarantula"
 "Rain Is Falling"
 "Guns of Slack"
 "Sleep Outside (live)"

The Slackers albums
1993 albums